Ampel Mosque is an ancient mosque located in the Ampel sub-district, district Semampir, Surabaya, East Java. The oldest mosque in East Java was built in 1421 CE by Sunan Ampel where his tomb complex is located within the area.

Architecture
The mosque, which is currently one of the religious attractions in the city of Surabaya, is surrounded by buildings with Chinese and Arab architectures. In the left side of the mosque there is a well that is believed to be the auspicious well, typically used by those who believe to strengthen a pledge or oath.

The tomb complex built with a walled courtyard and gateways.  The structures led up to the grave of Sunan Ampel.  Panataran, dedicated to Siva of the mountain, comprises a sequence of three walled compounds called Jeroan, Jaba Tengah (with the ancillary temple or Perwara) and Jaba (the last and the highest, containing the main shrine).

Gallery

See also

Islamic architecture
Islam in Indonesia
Indonesian architecture
List of the oldest mosques in the world

References

 
 

Mosques in Surabaya
Religious buildings and structures in East Java
Cultural Properties of Indonesia in East Java
Religious buildings and structures completed in 1421